The water polo tournaments at the 2016 Summer Olympics in Rio de Janeiro took place from 6 to 20 August at the Maria Lenk Aquatics Centre in Barra da Tijuca. Twenty teams (twelve for men and eight for women) competed in the tournament. Games that ended in ties in elimination rounds were decided by shootouts, as overtime has been abolished since 2013.

Qualification

Men's qualification

Women's qualification

Competition schedule

Men's competition

The competition consisted of two stages; a group stage followed by a knockout stage.

Group stage
The teams were divided into two groups of six countries, playing every team in their group once. Two points were awarded for a victory, one point for a draw. The top four teams per group qualified for the quarterfinals.

Group A

Group B

Knockout stage

Women's competition

The competition consisted of two stages; a group stage followed by a knockout stage.

Group stage
The teams were divided into two groups of four countries, playing every team in their group once. Two points were awarded for a victory, one for a draw. All teams qualified for the quarterfinals.

Group A

Group B

Knockout stage

Medal summary

Medal table

Medalists

See also
Water polo at the 2014 Asian Games
Water polo at the 2015 European Games
Water polo at the 2015 Pan American Games

References

Sources
 PDF documents in the Olympic World Library:
 Official Results Book – 2016 Olympic Games – Water Polo (archive)
 Water polo on the Olympedia website
 Water polo at the 2016 Summer Olympics (men's tournament, women's tournament)
 Water polo on the Sports Reference website
 Water polo at the 2016 Summer Games (men's tournament, women's tournament) (archived)

External links

 
 
 
 Results Book – Water Polo

 
2016
2016 Summer Olympics events
2016 in water polo
International aquatics competitions hosted by Brazil